Artem Pashporin (born 26 January 1993, Bogorodsk, Russia – Russian professional welterweight Muay Thai fighter and kickboxer. World Champion W5 (2015), Two times world champion GPRO (2016,2022), intercontinental WKU Champion (2018), World Champion S-1 (2018), European WMC Champion (2018) and four-time KWU Champion (2021).

Biography and career 
He was born in the city of Bogorodsk, Nizhny Novgorod region. Then, together with his parents, he moved to the city of Nizhny Novgorod. He is wanted to practice martial arts since childhood. He wanted to become a judoka following the example of his father, but due to the absence of coaches in the city at the age of 11, he turned to karate. Following the trainer, Maxim Vinogradov, who participated in Muay Thai competitions, turned to this kind of martial arts, which soon became his speciality.

During one of the fights, he made several cut his opponent's head, after that, in consonance with the last name, he received the nickname "Rus Spur". In continuation of the theme for the professional ring chose the image of a cowboy.

In parallel with sports, he studied at Nizhny Novgorod State Technical University named Alekseev.

In 2015, Artem Pashporin won the Russian Muay Thai Cup in categories up to 71 kg. In the summer of 2015, Artem went to the bout against Muay Thai legend Buakaw Banchamek, who won by decision after three rounds. At the end of the year in Vienna in fights with Cosmo Alexandre(Brazil) and Chris Ngimbi (Congo) Artem won the W5 world title.

In 2016, he became GPRO world champion , in the third round, he forced Itay Gershon (Israel) to refuse to continue the fight.

In 2017 he have lost the title of W5 world champion in the fight with kickboxing legend Giorgio Petrosyan, losing to him on points in a five-round bout.

In 2018, Artem started with a knockout win in the second round over Magnus Andersson (Sweden) at the Battle of Champions-10 tournament, where he represented Russia in the muay thai block. In the next fight, Artem was to fight with Enriko Kehl (Germany) at the ACB KB – 15 tournament, but the fight did not take place for reasons unknown to both sides. Until the end of this year, Artem was able to win three more belts. Intercontinental champion WKU, World champion S-1, European WMC champion. 2018 was the most fruitful in Artem's career. During the year he scored 5 wins in 5 fights and won 4 belts.

Artem started 2019 with a rematch with the Muay Thai and kickboxing living legend Buakaw Banchamek, in which he lost on points. The fight was the main event of the All Star Fight tournament, which was held on March 9 in Bangkok (Thailand) under the open sky at the stadium of the second cavalry division of the King's guard. The next fight Rus Spur spent the same with a fighter of the club Banchamek. On the eighth of July at the arena of the RCC Academy in Yekaterinburg in the framework of the Fair Fight IX tournament, Artem Pashporin managed to win by the results of three rounds over Yodwicha Banchamek by a unanimous decision of the judges, however, later the organizers of the tournament decided to cancel the result of this fight because of public criticism. On September 14, Artem returned to the Kunlun Fight tournament to compete for the title of Intercontinental champion in the four-man tournament. In the first fight, the Russian won over Song Shaoqiu from China, and in the final lost by a split decision to the representative of Belarus Dzianis Zuev. Artem planned to finish 2019 at the Battle of Champions 11 tournament, where in the main fight he had to fight for the title of Intercontinental champion according to WMC, against Masoud Minaeyu from Iran, but an arm injury received in the first fight of the tournament-four KLF did not allow Artem to enter the fight. Instead, two-time Thai boxing world champion in Magomed Zainukov came to the fight and won the title of Intercontinental champion according to WMC.

2020 has become a very difficult year for all professional athletes, martial artists are no exception. The first and main surprise of 2020 was the pandemic due to COVID-19, due to which Artem in Kunlun Fight could not provide the number of fight prescribed in the contract. In many other international organizations, there were cancellations and transfers of tournaments, at which preliminary agreements were reached on the fights for the Russian Spur. In this situation, Artyom's team, on a short notice, agrees to fight in the Fair Fight organization. The invitation to the tournament came literally a few days before the tournament, but Artem agrees, because he understands that in a pandemic, this may be the only proposal in this year. In the fight at Fair Fight, Spur is inferior by knockout in the second round, although until this moment he is leading the fight on points. After this defeat, Artem continues to keep train. In August, he received an invitation from Senshi to go to the international Kyokushin World Union training camp along with kickboxing legends Peter Aerts, Semmy Schilt and Ernesto Hoost. Artem received an offer to take part in a professional fight in Bulgaria in December against Dmitry Glevki from Portugal. However, later due to the pandemic, the event was postponed to February 2021. Then Artem decided to take part in the amateur muaythai Cup of Russia, in which he had 4 fights and in all of them he won in empathic fashion.

Titles 
 2022 KWU champion weight category up to 70 kg
 2022 World Gpro Champion in the weight category up to 71 kg
 2021 Four-time KWU champion weight category up to 70 kg
 2020 Winner of the muay thai Russian Cup in the weight category up to 71 kg
 2018 European WMC Champion in the weight category up to 69.9 kg
 2018 World S-1 Champion in the weight category up to 71 kg
 2018 Intercontinental WKU Champion in the weight category up to 72 kg
 2018 Winner of the Battle of Champions tournament – 10 in the muay thai block
 2016 World Gpro Champion in the weight category up to 71 kg
 2015 World W5 Champion in the weight category up to 71 kg
 2015 Winner of the muay thai Russian Cup in the weight category up to 71 kg

Professional kickboxing record 

|- style="text-align:center; background:#FFBBBB;"
| 2022-07-15 || Loss || align="left" |  Khayal Dzhaniev || Fair Fight 18 || Yekaterinburg, Russia || Decision (Unanimous) || 3 ||3:00
|- style="text-align:center; background:#CCFFCC;"
| 2022-02-26 || Win || align=left |  Alessio Malatesta ||Senshi 11 || Varna. Bulgaria || Ext. R Decision || 4 ||3:00
|- style="text-align:center; background:#CCFFCC;"
| 2022-01-27 || Win || align=left |  Vlad Vlasenko  || Gpro-Mineev || Moscow, Russia || Decision (Unanimous) || 5 ||3:00
|-
! style=background:white colspan=9 |

|- style="text-align:center; background:#CCFFCC;"
| 2021-12-04 || Win || align=left |  Alexis Laugeois ||  Senshi 10 || Varna, Bulgaria || Decision (Unanimous) || 3 ||3:00
|-
! style=background:white colspan=9 |

|- style="text-align:center; background:#CCFFCC;"
| 2021-07-10 || Win || align=left |  Oleg Tsvik || Senshi 9 || Varna, Bulgaria || Decision (Unanimous) || 3 ||3:00
|-
! style=background:white colspan=9 |
|- style="text-align:center; background:#CCFFCC;"
| 2021-05-22 || Win || align=left |  Farkhad Akhmedjanov  || Senshi 8 || Sofia, Bulgaria || Decision (Unanimous) || 3 ||3:00
|-
! style=background:white colspan=9 |

|- style="text-align:center; background:#CCFFCC;"
| 2021-02-27 || Win || align=left |  Dmitry Glevka || Senshi 7 || Sofia, Bulgaria || KO (Body) || 2 ||
|-
! style=background:white colspan=9 |

|- style="text-align:center; background:#FFBBBB;"
| 2020-03-21 || Loss || align="left" |  Vasiliy Semenov || Fair Fight XI || Yekaterinburg, Russia || KO (Punches) || 2 ||
|-
|- style="text-align:center; background:#FFBBBB;"
| 2019-09-14 || Loss || align="left" |  Dzianis Zuev|  || Kunlun Fight 83 || Guizhou, China || Decision (Split) || 3 ||3:00
|-
! style=background:white colspan=9 |

|- style="text-align:center; background:#CCFFCC;"
| 2019-09-14 || Win || align=left |  Song Shaoqiu|| Kunlun Fight 83 || Guizhou, China || Decision (Unanimous) || 3 ||3:00

|-  style="text-align:center; background:#c5d2ea;" 
| 2019-07-08 || NC ||align=left| Yodwicha Por Boonsit  || Fair Fight IX || Yekaterinburg, Russia || No contest  || 3 ||3:00

|- style="text-align:center; background:#FFBBBB;"
| 2019-03-09 || Loss || align=left |  Buakaw Banchamek || All Star Fight 8 || Bangkok, Thailand || Decision (Unanimous) || 3 ||3:00
|- style="text-align:center; background:#CCFFCC;"
| 2018-12-22 || Win || align=left |  Ayman Nayanesh || Muaythai Factory || Perm, Russia || Decision (Unanimous) || 3 ||3:00
|-
! style=background:white colspan=9 |

|- style="text-align:center; background:#CCFFCC;"
| 2018-11-04 || Win || align=left |  Arbi Emiev
| Knights ring Moscow suburbs
| Roshal, Russia
| Decision (Unanimous)
|3
|
|-
! style=background:white colspan=9 |

|- style="text-align:center; background:#CCFFCC;"
| 2018-08-05 || Win || align=left |  Zhu Baotong || Kunlun Fight 75 || Sanya, China || Ext.R Decision || 4 ||3:00

|- style="text-align:center; background:#CCFFCC;"
| 2018-05-13 || Win || align=left |  Danil Vinnik
| Prime Selection 2018
| Krasnodar, Russia
| Decision (Split)
| 5
|3:00
|-
! style=background:white colspan=9 |

|- style="text-align:center; background:#CCFFCC;"
| 2018-04-16 || Win || align=left |  Magnus Andersson
| Battle of Champions – 10
| Moscow, Russia
| KO
| 2
|- style="text-align:center; background:#FFBBBB;"
| 2017-08-27 || Loss || align="left" |  Mohamed Mezouari || Kunlun Fight 65 – World MAX 2017 Final 16 || Qingdao, China || TKO (Three Knockdowns/Left Body Hook) || 1 ||
|- style="text-align:center; background:#FFBBBB;"
| 2017-06-10 || Loss || align="left" |  Superbon Banchamek || Kunlun Fight 62 || Bangkok, Thailand || Decision (Unanimous) || 3 ||3:00
|- style="text-align:center; background:#CCFFCC;"
| 2017-04-23 || Win || align="left" |  Jomthong Chuwattana || Kunlun Fight 60 Group G Tournament Final || Guizhou, China || Decision || 3 ||3:00
|- style="text-align:center; background:#CCFFCC;"
| 2017-04-23 || Win || align="left" |  Yuichiro Nagashima || Kunlun Fight 60 – 70 kg World Max 2017 Group G Tournament Semi-finals || Zunyi, China || TKO (Ref.stop/3 Knockdowns) || 2 ||
|- style="text-align:center; background:#FFBBBB;"
| 2017-02-18 || Loss || align="left" |  Giorgio Petrosyan || W5 Grand Prix KITEK XXXIX || Moscow, Russia || Decision (unanimous) || 5 ||3:00
|-
! style=background:white colspan=9 |

|- style="text-align:center; background:#CCFFCC;"
| 2016-03-20 || Win || align="left" |  Li Zhuangzhunag || Kunlun Fight 39, 1/16 Final || Guangzhou, China || Decision || 3 ||3:00
|- style="text-align:center; background:#CCFFCC;"
| 2016-03-20 || Win || align="left" |  Victor Nagbe || Kunlun Fight 39 || Guangzhou, China || Decision (Unanimous)  || 3 ||3:00
|- style="text-align:center; background:#CCFFCC;"
| 2016-03-05 || Win || align="left" |  Itay Gershon || Grand Prix Russia Open 19 || Moscow, Russia || Decision (Unanimous) || 3 ||3:00
|-
! style=background:white colspan=9 |

|- align="center" style="background:#CCFFCC"
| 2015-12-05 || Win || align="left" |  Chris Ngimbi || W5 Grand Prix Vienna XXXI, Final || Vienna, Austria || Decision (unanimous) || 3 || 3:00
|-
! style=background:white colspan=9 |

|- style="text-align:center; background:#CCFFCC;"
| 2015-12-05 || Win || align="left" |  Cosmo Alexandre|| W5 Grand Prix Vienna XXXI || Vienna, Austria || Decision (unanimous) || 3 ||3:00
|- style="text-align:center; background:#FFBBBB;"
| 2015-07-01 || Loss || align="left" |  Buakaw Banchamek || T-one Muay Thai 2015 || Beijing, China || Decision (Unanimous) || 3 ||3:00

|- style="text-align:center; background:#CCFFCC;"
| 2015-02-26 || Win || align="left" |  Tural Bayramov || Grand Prix Russia Open 16 || Moscow, Russia || Decision || 3 ||3:00

|- style="text-align:center; background:#FFBBBB;"
| 2014-11-16 || Loss || align=left |  Zheng Zhaoyu
| Kunlun Fight 13, World Tournament 1/2 Final 
| Hohhot, China
| TKO
| 3
|

|- style="text-align:center; background:#CCFFCC;"
| 2014-10-11 || Win || align=left |  Petmankong Petsaman
| K-1 World Max Final
| Pattaya, Thailand
| Decision (Unanimous)
| 3
|3:00

|- style="text-align:center; background:#FFBBBB;"
| 2014-10-05 || Loss || align="left" |  Victor Nagbe
| Kunlun Fight 11, World Tournament 1/4 Final 
| Macao, China
| Decision (Split)
| 3
|3:00

|- style="text-align:center; background:#CCFFCC;"
| 2014-07-27 || Win || align="left" | Li Zikai
| Kunlun Fight 7, World Tournament 1/8 Final 
| Henan, China
| Decision (Unanimous)
| 3
|3:00

|- style="text-align:center; background:#FFBBBB;"
| 2014-05-22 || Loss || align="left" | Andrei Kulebin || Grand Prix Russia Open 14 ||Nizhny Novgorod, Russia|| Decision (unanimous) || 4 || 3:00
|-
! style=background:white colspan=9 |

|- style="text-align:center; background:#CCFFCC;"
| 2014-05-22 || Win || align="left" | Sergey Kulyaba || Grand Prix Russia Open 14 || Nizhny Novgorod, Russia|| Decision (Unanimous) || 3 || 3:00
|-
|- style="text-align:center; background:#CCFFCC;"
| 2013-12-22 || Win || align="left" |  Oganes Sarfaryan || W5 Grand Prix || Moscow Russia || Decision (Unanimous) || 3 ||3:00

|- style="text-align:center; background:#CCFFCC;"
| 2013-11-16 || Win || align="left" | Sascha Jovanovic || W5 Grand Prix Orel || Orel, Russia|| Decision (Unanimous) || 3 ||3:00

|- style="text-align:center; background:#CCFFCC;"
|2013-10-03
|Win
| align=left |  Ivan Babachenko
|Grand Prix Russia Open 13
|Nizhny Novgorod, Russia
|KO
|4
|

|-style="text-align:center; background:#CCFFCC;"
|2013-05-29
|Win
| align=left |  Sosom Surachai
|Grand Prix Russia Open 12
|Nizhny Novgorod, Russia
|Decision (Unanimous)
|3
|3:00

|-
|- style="text-align:center; background:#CCFFCC;"
| 2013-04-24 || Win || align="left" |  Rasul Kachkaev || W5 Fighter 21 || Orel, Russia|| Decision (Unanimous) || 3||3:00
|-
|-style="text-align:center; background:#FFBBBB;"
|2013-04-06
|Loss
|align="left" | Sergey Adamchuk
|Grand Prix Russia Open 11
|Nizhny Novgorod, Russia
|Decision (Split)
|3
|3:00

|-style="text-align:center; background:#FFBBBB;"
|2012-11-29
|Loss
|align="left" | Yuri Zhukovsky
|W5 FIGHTER MILK MOSCOW 17
|Moscow Russia
|Decision (Unanimous)
|3
|3:00

|- style="text-align:center; background:#CCFFCC;"
| 2012-10-11 || Win || align="left" | Bogdan Pogorelov
| W5 Fighter Moscow XV ||Moscow Russia|| Decision (Unanimous) || 4
|-
|- style="text-align:center; background:#CCFFCC;"
| 2012-04-19 || Win || align="left" |  Uzinbek Baydlda
| W5 FIGHTER ARENA MOSCOW XII || Moscow Russia ||Decision (Unanimous)
| 3
|3:00

|-style="text-align:center; background:#CCFFCC;"
|2011-11-11
|Win
| align=left |  Dmitri Shilovsky
|Crown Cup 6
|Moscow Russia
|Decision (Unanimous)
|3
|3:00

|-style="text-align:center; background:#CCFFCC;"
|2011-10-28
|Win
| align=left |  Ramil Navruzov
|Crown Cup 4
|Moscow Russia
|Decision (Unanimous)
|3
|-style="text-align:center; background:#CCFFCC;"
|2011-09-02
|Win
| align=left |  Alexei Frolov
|Muaythai Prof 11
|Kstovo, Russia
|Decision (Unanimous)
|3
|3:00

|-style="text-align:center; background:#CCFFCC;"
|2009-08-08
|Win
| align=left |  Artem Kosichkin
|Muaythai Prof 5
|Nizhny Novgorod, Russia
|Decision (Unanimous)
|3
|3:00
|-style="text-align:center;"
| colspan=9 | Legend:    
|}

References

External links 
 Artem Pashporin on the website Russian muaythai Federation
 Artem Pashporin's statistics on the site W5
 Artem Pashorin Artem Pashporin's profile on Facebook

Russian male kickboxers
Kunlun Fight kickboxers
Welterweight kickboxers
Living people
1993 births